Brusqeulia costispina is a species of moth of the family Tortricidae. It is found in Espírito Santo, Brazil.

The wingspan is about 10 mm. The ground colour of the forewings is whitish, sprinkled with greyish. The suffusions and strigulae (fine streaks) are grey. The hindwings are brownish grey, but transparent and pale in the basal half.

Etymology
The specific name refers to the presence of the costal spine of the valve and is derived from Latin spina (meaning a spine).

References

Moths described in 2011
Brusqeulia
Moths of South America
Taxa named by Józef Razowski